Dick Vernon Witcher (October 10, 1944February 22, 2021) was an American professional football player who was a wide receiver in the National Football League (NFL). Witcher was drafted by the San Francisco 49ers in the eighth round (119th overall) of the 1966 NFL Draft. At , Witcher first played two years at Bakersfield College, then graduated from UCLA. Witcher played in eight NFL seasons from 1966 to 1973 for the 49ers.

Witcher was a backup to Dave Parks and Bernie Casey during his rookie season. After Casey was traded to the Los Angeles Rams in 1967, Witcher moved into the starting lineup and led the 49ers with 46 receptions. Witcher followed up with 39 receptions in 1968. Witcher started 1969 as a backup to Gene Washington and Clifton McNeil, but by the 6th game he moved back into the starting lineup ahead of McNeil. He ended up with 33 receptions in 1969.

Against Cleveland in 1970, Witcher suffered his most serious injury of his career, a separated shoulder. He missed 3 games, the only games missed in his 49er career. With John Brodie having an MVP season and the 49ers with a solid defense, the team won its division with a 10–3–1 record, qualifying for the playoffs. At Minnesota, Witcher caught a 24-yard TD in the 17–14 upset win over the Vikings. Witcher scored the 49ers lone TD the following week against the Dallas Cowboys in the NFC Championship Game at Kezar Stadium.

After an 18 reception season in 1971, the 49ers looked to upgrade the wide receiver position opposite Gene Washington. Terry Beasley from Auburn was the 49ers 1st draft pick in the 1972 NFL Draft. However, Witcher opened the season as the 49ers starting receiver. By now, he was also the 49ers backup tight end, replacing the traded Bob Windsor. After 6 games, Witcher had only 2 receptions and was replaced with Preston Riley. In the final game of the season against Minnesota, the 49ers needed a win to qualify for the playoffs. Down 17–6 in the 4th quarter, Brodie came off the bench after an injury to throw 2 TD passes to win the game and the division title. The second TD was a 2-yard rollout pass to Witcher in the final seconds of the game. It was one of the great 49ers moments of their history to that point.

After the 1973 season, Witcher signed with the Southern California Sun of the WFL. He was traded to the Chicago Bears during training camp, but was cut by the Bears. In his first game with the Sun, Witcher scored the winning TD with a reception against the Detroit Wheels. After a few games, Witcher left the Sun and was done with professional football.

Witcher died from liver cancer in February 22, 2021.

References

External links
Career stats

1944 births
2021 deaths
Sportspeople from Salinas, California
Players of American football from California
American football wide receivers
Deaths from liver cancer
UCLA Bruins football players
San Francisco 49ers players
Southern California Sun players